Calvin "Buck" Alexander (August 4, 1895 – April 27, 1931) was a Negro leagues pitcher before the founding of the first Negro National League, and in its first few seasons.  He pitched for the San Antonio Black Bronchos, Detroit Stars, Indianapolis ABCs and Cleveland Elites.

References

External links
 and Baseball-Reference Black Baseball Stats and  Seamheads

Cleveland Elites players
Detroit Stars players
Indianapolis ABCs players
San Antonio Black Bronchos players
1895 births
1931 deaths
Baseball pitchers
Baseball players from Austin, Texas
20th-century African-American sportspeople